Liam Thompson may refer to:

 Liam Thompson (footballer) (born 2002), English footballer
 Liam Thompson (rugby league) (born 1992), English rugby player
 Liam Thompson (YouTuber) (born 2000), New Zealand YouTube personality